Bougoutoub may refer to several places in the Ziguinchor Region of Senegal:

 Bougoutoub Bani
 Bougoutoub Djinoubor